The Sandy Hollow–Gulgong railway line is a railway line in eastern New South Wales, Australia. The line forms a cross country connection from the Main North line in the Upper Hunter region to the Gwabegar line in the Central West region. From the Gwabegar line, trains can then ultimately reach the Main West line creating a circuitous bypass of Sydney for freight traffic heading between the west and north of New South Wales. The line was opened in 1985.

History

The Sandy Hollow Line between Sandy Hollow, Gulgong and Maryvale, (between Wellington and Dubbo), was originally surveyed in 1860 as a more easily graded crossing of the Great Dividing Range than the Blue Mountains line nearer to Sydney. It was not commenced, however, until 1937, when it began as an unemployment relief scheme of the NSW Government, achieving infamy for having no modern mechanical devices used on it, other than trucks carrying concrete for the 5 tunnels and bridge piers, all other work being done with picks, shovels, hand drills, horses and carts. Folk singer Duke Tritton wrote a poem The Sandy Hollow Line , which described the hardships of the unemployed workers on "susso" who worked on the line.

Construction continued through World War 2 at a desultory pace, held up by money, labour and especially steel shortages, only to be abandoned unfinished, approximately 92% complete, a few years later in 1951. The line crosses the Great Dividing Range by following the Goulburn River and Bylong Valleys from Sandy Hollow to Bylong, with a tunnel under Cox's Gap.

The Kerrabee Tunnel, No.1 of 3 in the Bylong range and 1 of 5 on the entire line, that was built under Cox's Gap between 1946 and 1949 was used for eastbound road traffic on the Bylong Valley Way until work recommenced in the early 1980s. It was used in 1978 in the filming of the opening scene for the television series Torque, hosted by Peter Wherrett. In that scene, a Bolwell Nagari driven by Wherrett approached as lights in the dark tunnel, then the camera drew back as the car drove out of the tunnel. The tunnel was also used in a scene in the Australian movie The Chain Reaction

The line was opened as a heavy-haul railway to the major coal mine at Ulan in 1982 and extended to Gulgong in 1985 to meet the line to Dunedoo and Dubbo. It is unlikely to be extended to Maryvale.

Current status 

Because of Coal from the Ulan Area is now the primary function of this line, Australian Rail Track Corporation (ARTC) refer to the line as the Ulan line all the way from Muswellbrook to Gulgong. Coal from the Ulan, Moolarben, Wilpinjong @ the Western Ulan End and Mangoola (Anvil Hill), Mt Pleasant and Bengalla Mines close to Muswellbrook also use this line. In preparation for this, ARTC are upgrading the lines in the Muswellbrook yard and adding two more passing loops to the Ulan line in 2007.More Loops have been added since then as below. The line previously used outdated electric train staff (ETS) safeworking procedures in 5 sections over its length. This is being replaced with centralised traffic control (CTC) in 5 stages. The stages correspond to the 5 ETS sections, numbered from Muswellbrook to Gulgong. The 4th stage, to Ulan, was completed in May 2008. This extends CTC to the westernmost coal mine on the line, covering the majority of train movements on the line.

Progress at upgrading the signaling by ARTC was criticised as slow and causing bottlenecks. The upgrade was previously due to be completed at the end of 2007.

Station layout 

Ulan has a balloon loop to terminate, load, and return the coal trains up to 1800m long. There is also a crossing loop 900m long. Unlike earlier plans, there are no sidings for general freight, nor any passenger platforms.

Wilpinjong, Moolarben, Mangoola (Anvil Hill), Mt Pleasant and Bengalla also have a balloon loops.

Crossing loops 

As of December 2019, there are thirteen crossing loops. The loops (and their lengths) are located at:
Bengalla – 1770m
Mangoola – 1670m
Yarrawa – 1660m
Sandy Hollow – 1558m
Baerami – 1655m
 Kerrabee – 1550m
Murrumbo – 1660m
 Bylong – 3424m
 Coggan Creek – 1740m
Wollar – 1655m
Wilpinjong – 1660m
 Ulan – 936m
 Gulgong – 400m

See also 
 Rail transport in New South Wales

References

External links 
 Tunnels in NSW

Regional railway lines in New South Wales
Standard gauge railways in Australia
Railway lines opened in 1985
1985 establishments in Australia
Central West (New South Wales)